Breadsall railway station was a former railway station in Breadsall, Derbyshire. It was opened by the Great Northern Railway (Great Britain) on its Derbyshire Extension in 1878.

History 

From  and the summit at Morley Tunnel, the line descended to Breadsall, on a gradient of 1 in 100.

The station itself was very close to the village and was provided with substantial brick buildings, including a two-storey station master's house and single storey offices on the platforms.

The passenger service at the station finished in 1953, while goods services ended in 1962. The line itself continued in use for passenger services until 1964, and for goods until 1968.

From Breadsall, the line crossed the Derwent valley by a long succession of embankments and viaducts. It then entered the town through a deep cutting before reaching Derby Friargate.

Present day 
The platforms and their buildings were gradually demolished, although traces remain. The single storey buildings became unsafe and were pulled down. The stationmaster's house survived until 1978 in an increasingly decrepit state until it became unsafe following an arson attack and it too was demolished.

A length of the old trackbed has been opened up as the Great Northern Greenway bridlepath through Breadsall since 2009 and the site of the station is now more accessible.

References

Disused railway stations in Derbyshire
Railway stations in Great Britain opened in 1878
Railway stations in Great Britain closed in 1953
Former Great Northern Railway stations
Borough of Erewash